Autosticha modicella is a moth in the family Autostichidae. It was described by Hugo Theodor Christoph in 1882. It is found in the Russian Far East (Ussuri), Korea, Japan (Hokkaido, Honshu, Shikoku, Kyushu), Taiwan and China (Heilongjiang, Jilin, Henan, Zhejiang, Jiangxi, Hunan, Sichuan).

References

Moths described in 1882
Autosticha
Moths of Asia